Eleroy is an unincorporated community in Stephenson County, Illinois. The population was 85 at the 2000 census.

History
Eleroy was founded in 1846. The community was named for E. LeRoy, son of the community's first settler Hiram Jones.

References

Unincorporated communities in Stephenson County, Illinois
Unincorporated communities in Illinois